A by-election was held for the New South Wales Legislative Assembly electorate of East Sydney on 29 May 1861 because Henry Parkes had resigned having accepted a government commission with a salary of  to travel to England to lecture on immigration with William Bede Dalley.

Dates

Result

Henry Parkes resigned having accepted a government commission.

See also
Electoral results for the district of East Sydney
List of New South Wales state by-elections

References

1861 elections in Australia
New South Wales state by-elections
1860s in New South Wales